In geology, a succession is a series of strata or rock units in chronological order. Rock successions can be seen in cross sections through rock, for example in a road cut or cliff. With sedimentary layers of rocks, newer units will be above older units, except in cases of inversion.

See also 
 Carbon dating
 Geochronology
 Igneous intrusion
 Inclusion (mineral)
 Smith's laws

Geochronology